Dhamana is a village in Hansi-I mandal of the Hisar district, in the Indian state of Haryana. Dhamana is fifth village on Hisar-Tosam road, first is Dabra, Second is Mirkan, Third is Bhojraj, Four is Gunjar. Then Fifth is Dhamana. This village is also known as village of Ahir's peoples.

Adjacent villages

 Dabra (first village at Hisar-Tosham road) on MDR 108
 Mirkan (second village at Hisar-Tosham road) on MDR 108
 Bhojraj (third village at Hisar-Tosham road) on MDR 108
 Gunjar (fourth village)
 Dhamana (fifth village from Hisar to Tosham road)
 Kanwari (sixth village from Hisar to Tosham road)
 Balawas (seventh village at Hisar-Tosham road) on MDR 108 village having similar name is in Rewari District
 Nalwa (eighth village at Hisar-Tosham road) on MDR 108
 Khanak (ninth village at Hisar-Tosham road) on MDR 108
 Kutiya (mangali) in between Mirkan and Bhojraj.

Demographics
As of 2011 India census, Dhamana had a population of 1804 in 352 households. Males (931) constitute 51.6%  of the population and females (873) 48.39%. Dhamana has an average literacy (1226) rate of 67.96%, less than the national average of 74%: male literacy (729) is 59.46%, and female literacy (497) is 40.53%. In Dhamana, 10.75% of the population is under 6 years of age (194). It is also named as Dhamian in maps and in census 2011.

References

Villages in Hisar district